The Society for Social Medicine (SSM) is the primary organization for researchers in social, community, and public health in the UK and Ireland, founded in London in 1956. The society was renamed the Society for Social Medicine and Population Health. It is affiliated to the European Public Health Association and is a member of the International Epidemiological Association’s European Epidemiology Federation.

Aim
The main aim of the society is to engage research, development and training in a range of segments such as epidemiology, medical and healthcare for prevention of diseases.

Objectives
To advance knowledge for population health.

Membership
Membership is open to individuals anyone who is interested in the society's aims. There is a nomination process whereby prospective members are put forward for consideration by current members. Applicants who do not any current members can also apply however and their application will be considered.

Meetings
The Society holds an Annual Scientific Meeting each year in the British Isles. The conference proceedings and abstracts are published in a special supplement of the Journal of Epidemiology and Community Health.

References

External links
Society for Social Medicine

Public health organizations
Organizations established in 1953
Medical associations based in the United Kingdom
Scientific societies based in the United Kingdom
1953 establishments in the United Kingdom
Public health in the United Kingdom
Learned societies of the United Kingdom